Raxstar (born 21 November 1983) is British rapper from Luton. Raxstar came into popularity after the release of "Keep It Undercover" in 2005. Following up with tracks like "Jaaneman", "Ego", "Poison" and "Balwant", he gained more mainstream attention, and has become one of the most popular artists in Desi hip hop.

Early life 
Raxstar was born and raised in Luton, Bedfordshire, East of England into a working class family of Indian Punjabi Sikh descent. Raxstar has two brothers, one older and one younger.

Career

Early career 
Before the release of his first single, Raxstar created mixtapes in cassettes and CDs and passed them out to his peers in high school and college. After releasing music online on his website, Raxstar became a featured artist on one of Rishi Rich's projects.

Discography

Extended Play
 Fulfilling Ambition EP (2007)

Mixtapes
 Lost Ones (2008)
 Spring Cleaning (2010)
 About A Girl (2011)
 Late on Time (2012)
Dream Warriors Live Session (2014)

Studio albums

 Glass Ceiling (2018)
 Artbreak (2019)
 Threats (with KALY) (2019)

Singles

Awards
 Brit Asia TV Music Awards 2014 "Best Urban Asian Act"
 Eastern Eye 2014 Best Independent Act "
 Brit Asia TV Music Awards 2019 Best Collaboration for "Dance" by F1rstman, Juggy D, H Dhami, Mumzy and Raxstar

References

External links
 

Living people
English people of Indian descent
English male singers
British hip hop singers
English hip hop musicians
English male rappers
English male web series actors
21st-century English male actors
Singers from London
Rappers from London
Male actors from London
1983 births